Lands End Road Tabby Ruins is a historic archeological site located on Saint Helena Island near Frogmore, Beaufort County, South Carolina. The site contains the archaeological remains of a large late-18th to early-19th century house. The site has a tabby foundation pier and the partial outlines of a structure.

It was listed in the National Register of Historic Places in 1988.

References

Archaeological sites on the National Register of Historic Places in South Carolina
Buildings and structures in Beaufort County, South Carolina
National Register of Historic Places in Beaufort County, South Carolina
Tabby buildings